The Sacred Heart Church is a religious building belonging to the Catholic Church and is located in the town of The Bottom capital of the Caribbean island of Saba a dependent territory that has the status of special municipality of the Kingdom of the Netherlands in the Caribbean sea or sea of the Antilles.

It was founded in 1877 as a community being formally dedicated on 19 March 1935 by the priest Norbertus Groen. Follow the Roman or Latin rite and depends on the Catholic Diocese of Willemstad based on the island of Curacao. This is one of the three Catholic churches located on the island, the others being the "Conversion of St. Paul" in Windward Side and the "Queen of the Holy Rosary" (Heilige Rozenkranskerk) in the village of Hell's Gate.

See also
Roman Catholicism in Saba
Sacred Heart Church (disambiguation)

References

Roman Catholic churches in Saba
Buildings and structures in The Bottom
Roman Catholic churches completed in 1935
20th-century Roman Catholic church buildings in the Netherlands